Jane Austen in Manhattan is a 1980 American romantic drama film produced by Merchant Ivory Productions for LWT, but released for theatrical exhibition in UK and USA. It was the last film appearance of Anne Baxter and the début film of Sean Young.

The film concerns competing theatrical productions in present-day New York, of a recently discovered early Austen work.

Plot
Two teachers vie for the right to stage a play written by Jane Austen when she was twelve years old.

Cast

Starring
Anne Baxter - Lilliana Zorska
Robert Powell - Pierre
Michael Wager - George Midash
Tim Choate - Jamie
John Guerrasio - Gregory
Katrina Hodiak - Katya
Kurt Johnson - Victor Charlton
Philip Lenkowsky - Fritz
Charles McCaughan - Billie
Nancy New - Jenny
Sean Young - Ariadne Charlton
Iman - Sufi Leader

External links
Merchant Ivory Productions

1980 films
1980 romantic drama films
American romantic drama films
Merchant Ivory Productions films
Films directed by James Ivory
Films with screenplays by Ruth Prawer Jhabvala
Works about Jane Austen
1980s English-language films
1980s American films